Jed was a Pacific Northwestern American animal actor, known for his roles in the movies White Fang (1991), White Fang 2: Myth of the White Wolf (1994), The Journey of Natty Gann (1985), and The Thing (1982). He was born in 1977 and died in June 1995. He was a Vancouver Island wolf-Alaskan Malamute hybrid.

Life and Career
Jed was born at Whatcom Humane Society in Bellingham, Washington where Gerhardt "Gary" Winkler (Henry Winkler's second cousin) adopted him as part of his collection of  Siberian Huskies and Alaskan Malamutes. His first role was a brief one as a Norwegian dog in John Carpenter's The Thing (1982). The character he played in the film was the first form to be taken by a shapeshifting alien creature; some scenes required him to behave in an unsettling and unnatural way. Jed's performance in The Thing has been lauded by the many fans of the movie. His next film appearance would be in Disney's The Journey of Natty Gann. In 1991, Jed starred as Jack London's titular character White Fang in the Walt Disney film of the same name, starring a young Ethan Hawke.

Jed was trained by Clint Rowe, who was involved in the films that Jed was cast in and was also associated with the film Turner and Hooch. After filming Disney's sequel to "White Fang", Jed permanently remained with Clint Rowe in Acton, California until his death in June 1995. His remains were interred at Gary Winkler's mixed-dog breed animal sanctuary in Bellingham, Washington.

Filmography
The Thing (1982) (uncredited)
The Journey of Natty Gann (1985)
White Fang (1991)
White Fang 2: Myth of the White Wolf (1994) (uncredited)

References

External link
 

1977 animal births
1995 animal deaths
Dog actors
Individual wolves